Henry Downey (born 27 December 1966) is a former dual player of Gaelic games, who played as a Gaelic footballer at senior level for the Derry county team in the late 1980s, 1990s and early 2000s, where he usually played in at centre half back. He was part of Derry's 1993 All-Ireland Championship winning side, where he was captain. He also won two Ulster Senior Football Championships (1993 and 1998) and four National League (1992, 1995, 1996 and 2000) medals with Derry. He also played hurling.

Playing career
Downey played club football and hurling with Erin's Own GAC Lavey, with whom he won the 1991 All-Ireland Senior Club Football Championship. He was one of very few players in Ireland to complete this unique double of club and inter-county All-Irelands and almost did the extreme rarity of winning both competitions in the same year in 1993, but Lavey were defeated in the All-Ireland club after winning the Ulster Senior Club Football Championship for the second time. Downey also won four Derry Senior Football Championship and 12 Derry Senior Hurling Championship medals with Lavey.

Some of his key attributes included his leadership qualities and his surging runs up the field from the half back line.

Inter-county
Downey was part of the Derry side which won four national leagues in eight years (1992, 1995, 1996 and 2000), captaining the team in 1992 and 1996. Downey and Derry finished runners-up to Offaly in the 1998 National League decider.

In addition to his All-Ireland Club medal and two Ulster Club Championship medals he had massive success at Derry Championship level. He won four Derry Senior Football Championship, two Derry Minor Football Championships and twelve Derry Senior Hurling Championships.

Downey won an All-star in 1993 at centre back and was named 1993 Texaco Footballer of the Year. He also won Footballer of the Year at the 1993 Ulster GAA Writer's Association Awards.

School/college
Downey attended school at St Patrick's College, Maghera, for whom he won two consecutive MacRory Cups (1984 and 1985). The school went on to be runners-up in the 1984 Hogan Cup final. He attended Queen's University Belfast, where he won the Sigerson Cup.

Hurling career
Among Downey's hurling honours was winning the Ulster Under 21 Hurling Championship with Derry in 1986, defeating Antrim and Down along the way. He scored 0-12 against Antrim in the semi-final at Loughguile, with his brother Seamus scoring 1-03 in a 2-20 to 1-06 victory. They beat Down in the final after a reply; 3-09 to 1-02.

Honours

Football

County
 All-Ireland Senior Football Championship - Winner (1): 1993
 National Football League - Winner (4): 1992, 1995, 1996, 2000
 National Football League - Runner up: 1998
 Ulster Senior Football Championship - Winner (2): 1993, 1998
 Ulster Senior Football Championship - Runner up: 1992, 1997, 2000
 Dr McKenna Cup - Winner (1): 1993, 1999

Club
 All-Ireland Senior Club Football Championship - Winner (1): 1991
 Ulster Senior Club Football Championship - Winner (2): 1990, 1992
 Derry Senior Football Championship - Winner (4): 1988, 1990, 1992, 1993
 Derry Senior Football Championship - Runner up: 1998
 Derry Minor Football Championship - Winner (2): 1983, 1984
 Numerous underage awards

Province
 Railway Cup - Winner (?) - 1998, 2000 (captain), more?

School/College
 Sigerson Cup - Winner (1): 1990?
 MacRory Cup - Winner (2) - 1984, 1985
 Hogan Cup - Runner up: 1984

Individual
 Texaco Footballer of the Year: 1993
 All Star - Winner (1): 1993
 All Star - Nominated (runner up): 1992, more?
 Captain Derry Ulster and All-Ireland winning side: 1993
 Captain Derry National League winning sides: 1992, 1996
 Derry Senior football captain: 1991-1994, 1996

Hurling

County
 Ulster Under 21 Hurling Championship - Winner (1): 1986, 1987?????

Club
 Ulster Senior Club Hurling Championship - Runner up: 1986?, 1988?, 1994?, 1997?, 2001?
 Derry Senior Hurling Championship - Winner (12): 1985, 1986, 1988, 1990, 1991, 1992, 1994, 1995, 1997, 1999, 2001, 2002
 Derry Senior Hurling Championship - Runner up: 1993?, more?
 Numerous underage awards

Individual
 Combined Universities - Winner (1): Year?

Note: The above lists may be incomplete. Please add any other honours you know of.

References

External links
 QUB Profile

1966 births
Living people
All-Ireland-winning captains (football)
Alumni of Queen's University Belfast
Derry inter-county Gaelic footballers
Derry hurlers
Dual players
Lavey hurlers
Texaco Footballers of the Year
Winners of one All-Ireland medal (Gaelic football)